The Rear Admiral William S. Parsons Award for Scientific and Technical Progress is awarded each year by the Navy League of the United States to a Navy or Marine Corps officer, enlisted person or civilian, who has made an outstanding contribution in any field of science that has furthered the development and progress of the US Navy or Marine Corps. The award is named for Admiral William Sterling Parsons. The award is presented with a certificate and a watch along with other Professional Excellence Awards (Sea Service Awards) at the National Convention of the Navy League of the United States.

The award is described by the Navy League of the United States as:
"The Rear Admiral William S. Parsons Award is named for Admiral Parsons in recognition of his dedication to all aspects of scientific and technical advances and who was responsible to a marked degree for ensuring that the U.S. Navy remained in operational consonance with the ever-shifting and increasing demands of the changing world.
Presented since 1957, this award for scientific and technical progress is awarded to a Navy or Marine Corps officer, enlisted person or civilian who has made an outstanding contribution in any field of science that has furthered the development and progress of the Navy or Marine
Corps."

List of award winners
The following is the list of recipients:

Notes

References

External links
 Navy League of the United States
 Navy League of the United States Award Program

Science and technology awards
American science and technology awards
Awards established in 1957